Mira Loma High School is a public high school located in Arden-Arcade, California, United States. It is located south of Interstate 80, and east of Watt Avenue. It is a part of the San Juan Unified School District with a student body of approximately 1700 students from northeast Arden-Arcade and western Carmichael.

Mira Loma High School has been an IB World School since 1989, and is the largest International Baccalaureate program in Northern California.  Mira Loma also achieves consistently high pass rates for IB exams, taken in May.

According to Mira Loma, in 1996–1997 the school had a pass rate of 93%, with a 100% diploma attainment rate for students.  In 2007–2008 the pass rate was 93% with a 100% diploma attainment rate.  Both statistics are well above both the North American average (78%) and the world average (81%) for diploma attainment. For the 2015–2016 school year, Mira Loma has the highest average SAT score in the Sacramento area.

Students 

Students are enrolled from throughout the Carmichael area, but many of the students participating in the International Baccalaureate program enroll from as far as El Dorado Hills, California. As of 2016, Mira Loma enrolled 1681 students. The plurality were White, at 41%, with Asian, 26% and Hispanic, 19% being the other major ethnic groups. The school has a high rate of poverty, with 47% of the students being considered socioeconomically disadvantaged. The school has a graduation rate of 91%. 64% of 11th grade students met or exceeded the English language-arts standards as set by the California Standardized Testing and Reporting (STAR) Program, and 54% of 11th grade students met or exceeded the mathematics standards as set by the same organization.

Education 

Mira Loma offers a large number of International Baccalaureate courses that prepare students for IB examinations every spring. The IB tests are either Standard Level (SL) or Higher Level (HL) based on the amount of coursework prior to the examination. Mira Loma students tested in 18 different IB subjects in 2016.

It is one of the few campuses in its district to offer Mandarin Chinese as well as Japanese. It also offers Spanish and French as other foreign languages.

Additionally, AP Calculus is offered to eligible students. Other Advanced Placement courses (AP US History, AP Physics, AP Biology, AP Chemistry, AP Chinese, and AP Japanese) were previously offered at Mira Loma, but have since been discontinued in favor of a total IB campus.

Extracurricular activities

Academic competition 

The Mira Loma National Science Bowl team (consisting of a group of students that answer gameshow-style questions on science and mathematics) won the national championship in 2009, 2011, 2013, 2014, and 2015. With five victories, the school has more than any other in the history of Science Bowl, and their 3-year win streak is the second-longest in the history of the competition.

The Mira Loma Science Olympiad team regularly competes in the regional, state, and national level in various competitions sponsored by the United States Department of Energy. In 2016, the team won the National Tournament, and has placed highly in national competitions in other years. Mira Loma High School hosts the Sacramento Regional Science Olympiad every year.

Mira Loma's Speech and Debate team was founded in 2005 by a small group of students.

Mira Loma participates in the International Science Olympiads including Chemistry, Mathematics, Physics, Biology, and Astronomy.

Athletics 
Mira Loma also offers a full range of athletic teams including football, soccer, cross country, volleyball, water polo, wrestling, basketball, baseball, softball, track and field, tennis, golf, dance, and swimming.

Clubs 
Mira Loma also offers a variety of extracurricular clubs that meet at lunch and after school. Some of these clubs include Science Bowl, VEX Robotics Club, Astronomy Club, Mira Loma Tech and Create, Culinary Club, Speech and Debate, Young Republicans Club, Young Democrats Club, Math Club, Economics Club, Ping Pong Club, Pickleball Club, Youth Court, Mock Trial, Moot Court, International Relief Club, B Sharps, as well as ethnic organizations such as Latinos Unidos, Black Students Union, and Desi Plus Club. Religious organizations include the Slavic Christian Club and Muslim Students Association. Other extracurricular clubs include Matadors Against Cancer (American Cancer Society), Future Business Leaders of America, Mira Loma Video Game Tournament Club, Climate Crisis Club, Habitat for Humanity Club, Key Club, and a chapter of the National Spanish Honor Society. French, Japanese, and Chinese clubs are also active on campus.

Arcade Creek Project 
The Mira Loma Arcade Creek Project is an ongoing study of the riparian corridor of an urban watershed in Sacramento, California. It consists of eleven studies which measure the health of the Arcade Creek and is run by students of Mira Loma High School and five faculty advisers. The project has received awards and recognitions including the Governor's Environmental and Economic Leadership Award. In 2010, the project was awarded $10,000 from the National Sea World / Busch Gardens' Environmental Excellence Award.

On September 23, 2017, the film Arcade Creek Project: A Mosaic of Sustainability was premiered at the Sacramento Film and Music Festival. This documentary, directed by Jierel Almario, tells the story of the Arcade Creek Project, and the efforts of many students to restore it. It has been nominated for and awarded several awards at national and local film festivals.

Notable alumni 

Richard Chase (Class of 1968); "The Vampire of Sacramento" schizophrenic serial killer.
Alex Honnold (Class of 2003); Free climber.
James House (singer) (Class of 1973); Country songwriter and singer.
Sam J. Jones (Class of 1972); Actor.
Peter Mansoor (Class of 1978); retired United States Army officer, military historian, academic and commentator on national security affairs.
John Powell (athlete) (Class of 1965); track and field athlete, 1976 Olympic medalist and former world record holder in the discus.
Shawna Yang Ryan (Class of 1994); Author of Green Island and Water Ghosts.
Justin E. H. Smith (Class of 1990); Philosopher and author.
Will Swan (Class of 2003); Guitarist of Dance Gavin Dance, Secret Band, and Sianvar. Founder of Blue Swan Records.

References

External links 

 Official website
 San Juan Unified School District website
 Arcade Creek Project

International Baccalaureate schools in California
High schools in Sacramento, California
Public high schools in California
1960 establishments in California